Bryotropha politella is a moth of the family Gelechiidae. It is found in Ireland, England, Scotland and the Massif Central in France.

The wingspan is 12–16 mm for males and 13–15 mm for females. The forewings of the males are glossy brownish grey and the hindwings are grey, but slightly darker towards the apex. Females have pale ochreous forewings, mottled with brownish grey. The hindwings are grey. Adults have been recorded on wing from late May to late July.

The larvae feed on Rhytidiadelphus squarrosus. They live in a silken tube. The larvae have a purplish brown body and a black head.

References

Moths described in 1851
politella
Moths of Europe